Phryneta conradti is a species of beetle in the family Cerambycidae. It was described by Hermann Julius Kolbe in 1894. It is known from the Democratic Republic of the Congo, Tanzania and Malawi.

References

Phrynetini
Beetles described in 1894
Taxa named by Hermann Julius Kolbe